Bryan Alfred Thurlow (6 June 1936 – 5 January 2002) was a professional footballer who spent the majority of his career with Norwich City.

Thurlow, a right-back, began his career in local non-league football (playing for Loddon and Bungay Town) before signing for Norwich as a professional in August 1954. He stayed at Carrow Road for ten years, playing an important part in the club's run to the semi-finals of the FA Cup in 1959 and their promotion to division two a year later. In total, he played 224 games for Norwich, scoring 1 goal. After leaving Norwich in 1964, he played for Bristol City and Lowestoft Town before retiring. He died in 2002.

Sources
Canary Citizens by Mark Davage, John Eastwood, Kevin Platt, published by Jarrold Publishing, (2001), 

English footballers
Norwich City F.C. players
Bristol City F.C. players
Lowestoft Town F.C. players
1936 births
2002 deaths
Association football fullbacks